An Abendgymnasium or "Evening Gymnasium" is a German class of secondary school for adults over the age of 19 which allows them to gain the Abitur. Classes are usually held after 17:30 at night, although some classes may be held in the mornings for parents with school-age children. Lessons are taught in a similar fashion to those at a typical German Gymnasium and students will often remain at the school for 4 years before taking their final exams. Some institutions allow for online learning whereby students can complete the coursework for the Abitur at home and only need attend the school two nights a week. Tuition is typically free of charge for Germans at these schools.

See also
 Kolleg (a daytime school similar to the Abendgymnasium)
 Abendhauptschule
 Abendrealschule

Education in Germany
School types
Adult education
Gymnasium (school) system